RAF Bacton is a former Royal Air Force landing field, built to accommodate aircraft intercepting Zeppelin bombers during the First World War.

History

A unit to use Bacton was a detachment of No. 219 Squadron RAF between 22 July 1918 and March 1919 with various aircraft along with No. 470 (Fighter) Flight.

A hangar from RAF Bacton was relocated to North Walsham after the closure of the airfield, where it became a garage workshop.  This building was damaged in high winds, but an attempt to save the roof failed to salvage the structure, which was demolished in April 2007.

References

Citations

Bibliography

External links
RAF Bacton at Wikimapia

See also
Royal Air Force station
List of former Royal Air Force stations
List of Royal Air Force aircraft squadrons

Royal Air Force stations in Norfolk
World War I airfields
World War I sites in England